Boston Marathon qualifying standards allow runners to qualify for the Boston Marathon by running a previous marathon with a stipulated result within a stipulated calendar time frame.

The standards have been in place since 1970 for male runners and 1972 for female runners. The standards are published by the Boston Athletic Association (B.A.A.), in advance of the qualifying window.

To "qualify" for the Boston Marathon runners need to have run a marathon at a time given for their gender and age (as shown in the tables below). Before the 2012 marathon, qualification allowed runners to register and run the race. Since 2012, "qualifiers" who do not meet additional cutoff criteria (see below) are not eligible to enter the marathon by virtue of time qualification.

Men’s qualifying standards by year

Note: the minimum age before 1986 was 19.

Women’s qualifying standards by year

Note: the minimum age before 1986 was 19.

Cutoff

Beginning with the registration for the 2012 Boston Marathon, a cutoff beneath the qualifying times was instituted. The cutoff time is given in minutes and seconds and is subtracted from the age group qualifying times to determine who will be allowed entry and who will not. For example, for the 2012 marathon, when registration closed and the 1:14 cutoff was announced, a runner who "qualified" with a time faster than 3:10:00, actually needed a time of 3:08:46 to earn entry into the marathon.

References

Boston Marathon